The Bielszowice coal mine is a large mine in the south of Poland in Bielszowice district of Ruda Śląska, Silesian Voivodeship, 267 km south-west of the capital, Warsaw. Bielszowice represents one of the largest coal reserve in Poland having estimated reserves of 284.2 million tonnes of coal. The annual coal production is around 4 million tonnes.

References

External links 
 Official site

Buildings and structures in Ruda Śląska
Coal mines in Silesian Voivodeship
Buildings and structures completed in 1979